Aphelia deserticolor is a species of moth of the family Tortricidae. It is found in Saudi Arabia.

References

Moths described in 1983
Aphelia (moth)
Moths of Asia
Taxa named by Alexey Diakonoff